Josonia Palaitis (born 1949) is an Australian artist living in Sydney, Australia.  She won the 1994 Doug Moran National Portrait Prize with a portrait of her father artist John Mills. In 1995 she won the Archibald Prize People's Choice award with a portrait of Bill Leak (artist and cartoonist for the Australian Newspaper).

The National Portrait Gallery commissioned her in 2000 to paint its first portrait of an Australian Prime Minister to include their spouse, a portrait of John Howard and his wife Janette.  In 2002 she was commissioned to paint the Childers Memorial Portrait which depicts the fifteen young backpackers who died in a hostel fire in Childers, Queensland in 2000.

Her portrait Patrick Dodson, Yawuru Man, (of chairman of the Council for Aboriginal Reconciliation, Pat Dodson), was a finalist in the 1998 Doug Moran National Portrait Prize and is in the collection of the National Library of Australia.  Other prominent people she has painted include:
 musician James Morrison (1993 Archibald finalist),
 television presenter Ray Martin (1996 Archibald finalist),
 Cardinal Edward Clancy (1998 Portia Geach Memorial Award finalist),
 journalist Paddy McGuinness (2003 Portia Geach Memorial Award finalist), and
 Justice Michael Kirby (2006 Archibald Prize finalist).

References

External links 
Comprehensive gallery and information

Australian women painters
Living people
Artists from Sydney
1949 births
Doug Moran National Portrait Prize winners
Archibald Prize People's Choice Award winners
Archibald Prize finalists
21st-century Australian women artists
21st-century Australian artists